No Innocent Victim, or N.I.V., is a Christian hardcore punk band on Facedown Records. The band was formed in 1992 in San Diego, California. They released two albums, and then toured with Agnostic Front. In 1998 they signed to Victory Records and recorded the album Flesh and Blood. Many tours followed in the United States, Europe and Japan with bands like Agnostic Front, U.S. Bombs, Terror, Hatebreed, P.O.D., and Madball.

They released Tipping the Scales in 2001, and disbanded the following year. They reformed in 2004 and in 2005, added former xDisciplex A.D. members Dave Quiggle on guitar and Neil Hartman on bass respectively, signed to Facedown Records, and released fifth studio album To Burn Again. After being disbanded for many years, the band reunited in 2017 to play Facedown Fest.

Band members 
Current
 Jason Moody – vocals (1992–present)
 Tim Mason – guitar (2000–present)
 Dave Quiggle – guitar (2005–present)
 Neil Hartman – bass (2005–present)
 Jason Dunn – drums (1996–present)

Former
 Kurt Love – drums (1992–1996)
 Judd Morgan – bass guitar (1996–1998)
 Corey Edelmann – guitar (1995–2000, 2004–2005)
 Kyle Fisher – bass guitar (1998–2002, 2004)
 Chris Beckett – guitar (1992–1995)
 John Harbert – bass guitar (1992–1996)
 Truxton Meadows – vocals, guitar (1992)
 Chris Rapier – guitar (1992–1995)

Discography 
 Demo self-released (1993)
 Prepared for War split with Overcome and Clay (1995), Boot to Head Records
 Strength (1996), Rescue
 No Compromise (1997), Rescue
 No Innocent Victim / Phanatik split 7-inch EP (1998), Facedown Records
 Untitled Tolerance Records (1998) (compilation)
 The Crazy Engler Brothers EP (1999), Victory
 Flesh and Blood (1999), Victory
 Tipping the Scales (2001), Victory / Solid State
 To Burn Again (2005), Facedown

References

External links 

Christian hardcore musical groups
Christian rock groups from California
Hardcore punk groups from California
Musical groups established in 1992
Musical groups from San Diego
Victory Records artists
Solid State Records artists
Blood and Ink Records artists